Corning Municipal Airport  is a city-owned, public-use airport located three nautical miles (6 km) west of the central business district of Corning, a city in Clay County, Arkansas, United States. It is included in the National Plan of Integrated Airport Systems for 2011–2015, which categorized it as a general aviation facility.

Facilities and aircraft 
Corning Municipal Airport covers an area of 135 acres (55 ha) at an elevation of 293 feet (89 m) above mean sea level. It has one runway designated 18/36 with an asphalt surface measuring 4,299 by 60 feet (1,310 x 18 m).

For the 12-month period ending August 31, 2011, the airport had 33,200 aircraft operations, an average of 90 per day: 99% general aviation and 1% military. At that time there were 12 aircraft based at this airport: 83% single-engine and 17% multi-engine.

References

External links 
 Corning Municipal (4M9) at Arkansas Department of Aeronautics
 Aerial image as of February 2001 from USGS The National Map
 
 
 

Airports in Arkansas
Transportation in Clay County, Arkansas
Buildings and structures in Clay County, Arkansas